Łódź Voivodeship was a unit of administrative division and local government in Poland in years 1919–1939. At that time, it covered a large portion of the mid-western part of the country, including such cities as Łódź, Piotrków Trybunalski, Sieradz and Radomsko. The capital of the Łódź Voivodeship was always Łódź, but the area of land which comprised it changed several times.

Location and area

In early 1939, the Voivodeship's area was 20,446 square kilometers. It was located in middle Poland, bordering Poznań Voivodeship to the west, Pomorze Voivodeship to the north, Warsaw Voivodeship to the east Kielce Voivodeship to the south and Germany to the southwest. Landscape was flat, forests covered only 14.7%, with the national average 22.2% (as of January 1, 1937).

In 1938 some western counties were ceded to Poznań Voivodeship (see: Territorial changes of Polish Voivodeships on April 1, 1938). After the change, it consisted of 15 powiats (counties):

 Brzeziny county (area 1 100 km², pop. 150 900),
 Końskie county (area 1 619 km², pop. 135 900),
 Kutno county (area 922 km², pop. 108 000),
 Łask county (area 1 400 km², pop. 171 900),
 Łęczyca county (area 1 317 km², pop. 127 600),
 Łowicz county (area 1 258 km², pop. 104 800),
 city of Łódź county (powiat lodzki grodzki), (area 59 km², pop. 604 600). It was the most populous county of interbellum Poland,
 Łódź county (area 893 km², pop. 161 700),
 Opoczno county (area 1 773 km², pop. 129 900),
 Piotrków Trybunalski county (area 2 073 km², pop. 222 200),
 Radomsko county (area 2 149 km², pop. 186 400),
 Rawa Mazowiecka county (area 1 327 km², pop. 93 500),
 Sieradz county (area 1 618 km², pop. 167 400),
 Skierniewice county (area 831 km², pop. 71 000),
 Wieluń county (area 2 107 km², pop. 214 300).
The most populous cities of the Voivodeship were (population according to the 1931 Polish census):
 Łódź (pop. 604,600),
 Piotrków Trybunalski (pop. 51,300),
 Pabianice (pop. 45,700),
 Tomaszów Mazowiecki (pop. 38,000),
 Zgierz (pop. 26,600),
 Kutno (pop. 23,400),
 Radomsko (pop. 23,000).

Population

According to the 1931 Polish census, the population was 2,650,100. Poles made up 81% of the population, Jews 13.8% and Germans 4.9%. The Jews and the Germans preferred to live in the cities and towns (especially Łódź itself). In 1931 these two ethnic groups made up 37.6% of the Voivodeship's cities’ inhabitants. The illiteracy rate (in 1931) was 22.7%, slightly lower than the national average of 23.1%.

Industry

The Voivodeship's biggest industrial center was the city of Łódź with its suburbs. Apart from this, it lacked other industrial cities. The construction of a huge public works program, called Centralny Okręg Przemysłowy, which started in the second half of the 1930s, missed this part of Poland. Railroad density was 4.8 per 100 km², while the national average was 5.2. The biggest rail hubs were Koluszki, Kutno, Łowicz, Skierniewice, Zduńska Wola and Łódź.

Voivodes
Antoni Kamieński 19 November 1919 – 1 March 1922
Paweł Garapich 1 March 1922 – 14 February 1923 (p.o.)
Marian Rembowski 9 March 1923 – 12 August 1924
Paweł Garapich 12 August 1924 – 30 December 1924
Ludwik Darowski 1925 – 22 June 1926
Jan Ossoliński June 1926 – July 1926 (p.o.)
Władysław Jaszczołt June 1926 – 31 January 1933
Aleksander Hauke-Nowak 31 January 1933 – 13 April 1938
Henryk Józewski 13 April 1938 – 6 September 1939

See also
Poland's current Łódź Voivodeship
Territorial changes of Polish Voivodeships on April 1, 1938

References
 Maly rocznik statystyczny 1939, Nakladem Glownego Urzedu Statystycznego, Warszawa 1939 (Concise Statistical Year-Book of Poland, Warsaw 1939).

 
Former voivodeships of the Second Polish Republic